Camillo Herbert Grötzsch (21 May 1902 – 15 May 1993) was a German mathematician. He was born in Döbeln and died in Halle. Grötzsch worked in graph theory. He was the discoverer and eponym of the Grötzsch graph, a triangle-free graph that requires four colors in any graph coloring, and Grötzsch's theorem, the result that every triangle-free planar graph requires at most three colors. A student of Paul Koebe, he made important contributions to the theory of conformal mappings and univalent functions: he was the first to introduce the concept of a quasiconformal mapping.

Publications 
Herbert Grötzsch, Über die Verzerrung bei schlichten nicht-konformen Abbildungen und über eine damit zusammenhängende Erweiterung des Picardschen Satzes, Sitzungsberichte sächs. Akad. Wiss., Math.-Phys. Klasse, vol. 80, 1928, pp. 503–507

References 

 Reiner Kühnau, Herbert Grötzsch zum Gedächtnis. Jahresbericht der Deutschen Mathematiker-Vereinigung, vol. 99, 1997, pp. 122–145 (1997)
 Reiner Kühnau, Einige neuere Entwicklungen bei quasikonformen Abbildungen. Jahresbericht Deutscher Mathematikervereinigung, vol. 94, pp. 141–192 (1992)
 Horst Tietz, Herbert Grötzsch in Marburg. Jahresbericht der Deutschen Mathematiker-Vereinigung, vol. 99, 1997, pp. 146–148

External links
 Oberwolfach Photo Collection

1902 births
1993 deaths
20th-century German mathematicians
Graph theorists
Complex analysts
People from Halle (Saale)